Nizhny Novgorod railway station ( until 2010 Gorky-Moskovsky ) is a central station in Nizhny Novgorod, Russia. In terms of the amount of work performed, the 1st class station, and by the nature of the work performed, is a cargo station. It was opened on August 2, 1862.

History

The station in Nizhny Novgorod was built in 1862, when the Moscow-Vladimir railway was extended. On August 2, 1862, traffic was opened on the section Vladimir - Nizhny Novgorod. The station became the final point for the Moscow-Nizhny Novgorod railway. It consisted of three two-storey buildings connected by passages to the lobby in the center, waiting rooms, mail, telegraph, buffets and restaurants. A clock was installed on the central tower. Inside the building walls were decorated with mosaic panels on heroic themes.

In 1894, the imperial (tsardom) pavilion was built for the arrival of imperial persons in the city. The architect Dmitry Chichagov, a representative of the famous dynasty of Russian architects, designed both the building and the interiors. The hall of the pavilion was decorated with a large portrait of Nicholas II and a carved fireplace made of white Italian marble. A telephone was installed for important talks. The pavilion received the emperor twice: in 1896, during the All-Russia Exhibition and in 1913, during the celebration of the Romanov Tercentenary. During the 1905 revolution, it was captured by rebellious workers and held for some time. After the October Revolution of 1917, the Committee of the Bolsheviks of Kanavino and the medical institution of railway were located in the building at different times.

The Soviet government for a long time kept the old building. During the World War II, the Moscow railway station, along with the Kazan railway station, became an important strategic object. For the connection of the two stations between them were laid railway tracks through the cargo port on Spit and Kanavinsky bridge. German pilots tried several times to bombing the station, however, it was to no avail. Bombs was fell on Revolution Square and near to the modern building of the Central Department Store. After winning the war, trainloads arrived at the train station with victorious soldiers.

In the 1960s, the station building was completely rebuilt to give it a so-called “civilian look”. The entire historical facade was destroyed. Inside, the station also underwent major changes: the “pre-revolutionary” mosaics were replaced by Soviet ones in the spirit of the 20th century, the waiting rooms and many other rooms were rebuilt. In the center of the hall was placed a giant chandelier, made in the Netherlands, from a variety of metal panels. It has become a symbol of the renewed Soviet station and a meeting place for millions of passengers.

In 1985, after the launch of the metro, exits to the long passage to Moskovskaya metro station were equipped in the terminal building.

Since 2002, the station has been modernized, equipped with terminals for the automatic check of tickets, and construction of sheds over the platforms. From June 2017, the station was closed for renovation and opened only on April 28, 2018.

At the time of the reconstruction, the exit of passengers to platforms to long-distance trains and to electric trains was carried out through suburban tunnels. After the reconstruction, an updated terminal appeared, equipped and rebuilt in the spirit of the 21st century. In the waiting rooms there are cameras and shelves for charging mobile devices with combination locks. The giant chandelier was dismantled and sent to storage. Only two mosaic panels on the side walls inside the building remained from the Soviet era.

March 30, 2010 Gorky-Moskovsky station was renamed the modern name of Nizhny Novgorod-Moskovsky. On July 1 of the same year, the name of the Gorky-Moskovsky railway station was changed to Nizhny Novgorod according to the order of the President of Russian Railways JSC Vladimir Yakunin. But the name at the station itself was changed only in April 2014 from Moscow Railway Station to Railway Station, as only by that time it had been financed.

Services 
The station serves the Gorky Railway and has four suburban traffic directions: Shakhunya, Vladimir, Arzamas and the Zavolzhye. Long-distance trains have directions to Moscow, St. Petersburg, Kirov, Kazan and Novgorod.

International

High-speed rail

Note: Sapsan is now replaced with Talgo Strizh since 2015.

City Rail

From June 24, 2013, the first line of the City Rail (the analogue of the German S-Bahn, London Overground or Paris RER) was opened, which connects Sormovsky City District and railway station. It passes through quarters in which there is no metro and is its alternative. Trains run less frequently than on the subway, but more often than on suburban routes. During rush hours, the first-line train starts every 20–30 minutes. In 2018, a second line was opened connecting the station and the Prospekt Gagarina Station. It connects several areas and part of the suburb, because of which it has different tariff zones.

Gallery

References

Transport in Nizhny Novgorod
Buildings and structures in Nizhny Novgorod
Railway stations in the Russian Empire opened in 1862
1862 establishments in the Russian Empire
Gorky Railway
Railway stations in Nizhny Novgorod Oblast